The 2010 Rally New Zealand was the fifth round of the 2010 World Rally Championship season. The rally took place over 7–9 May and is based in the country's largest city, Auckland. The rally was also the fourth round of both the Production World Rally Championship and the Super 2000 World Rally Championship.

Jari-Matti Latvala took his third WRC win after taking advantage of an error by Sébastien Ogier on the final stage; which promoted the Finn into first place. Latvala eventually took the victory by just 2.4 seconds with Sébastien Loeb a further 12.8 seconds back in third position. Loeb had been leading prior to stage 19, before hitting a tree which cost him over 40 seconds.

Jari Ketomaa won the Super 2000 class of the rally, finishing in eighth position overall. Xavier Pons also broke the top ten overall as he finished behind Ketomaa to extend his championship lead to 20 points over Martin Prokop, who finished third in the class. Home drivers dominated the PWRC class as Pirelli Star Driver Hayden Paddon, Emma Gilmour and Kingsley Thompson took a 1-2-3 for New Zealand drivers.



Results

Event standings

Special stages

Standings after the rally

Drivers' Championship standings

Manufacturers' Championship standings

References

External links 
 Results at eWRC.com

New Zealand
Rally New Zealand
Rally
May 2010 sports events in New Zealand